Miguel Ángel Navarro Zárate (born 26 February 1999) is a Venezuelan professional footballer who plays as a defender for Major League Soccer club Chicago Fire.

Club career
Born in Maracaibo, Navarro made his professional debut for Primera División club JBL Zulia on 16 April 2017 against Aragua, starting during a 1–0 defeat. Following one season with JBL Zulia, Navarro joined fellow Primera División side Deportivo La Guaira. He made his debut for the club on 30 March 2018 against Monagas.

Chicago Fire
On 27 January 2020, Navarro moved to the United States and joined Major League Soccer side Chicago Fire. He made his debut for the club on 7 March 2020 against the New England Revolution, coming on as an 81st-minute substitute in a 1–1 draw.

International career
Navarro first represented his country Venezuela at the under-20s during the 2019 South American U-20 Championship, playing seven matches. He then represented his country at the under-23 level during the 2020 CONMEBOL Pre-Olympic Tournament.

Career statistics

Notes

References

1999 births
Living people
Venezuelan footballers
Venezuela under-20 international footballers
Association football defenders
Deportivo JBL del Zulia players
Chicago Fire FC players
Venezuelan Primera División players
Major League Soccer players
Expatriate soccer players in the United States
Venezuela international footballers
Sportspeople from Maracaibo